Ian Stevenson (born 23 September 1944) is a former Australian rules footballer who played with Essendon in the Victorian Football League (VFL). After his Essendon stint, Stevenson returned to his two old sides, East Devonport and North Ballarat, as well as playing with Kingsville.

Notes

External links 
		

Essendon Football Club past player profile

Living people
1944 births
Australian rules footballers from Tasmania
Essendon Football Club players
East Devonport Football Club players
North Ballarat Football Club players